Herbert Henry Gower (26 March 1899 – 23 August 1959), sometimes known as Nobby Gower, was an English amateur footballer and cricketer. As a footballer, he made two appearances in the Football League for Brentford and then embarked on a 10-year career in amateur football. Gower later opened the batting and kept wicket for Hayes Cricket Club.

Personal life 
Gower worked for the Civil Service and lived in Central Avenue, Hayes until 1939. Upon the outbreak of the Second World War that year, Gower's Civil Service department was relocated to Harrogate and he later settled there permanently. His son Phil was killed in an accident in 1943, while training with the Royal Navy Commandos in the New Forest.

Honours 
Southall
 Middlesex Senior Charity Cup: 1923–24 (shared)
Hayes
 London Senior Cup: 1931–32
 Middlesex Senior Cup: 1930–31

Career statistics

References

1899 births
English footballers
English Football League players
Brentford F.C. players
Association football fullbacks
Southall F.C. players
Dulwich Hamlet F.C. players
Hayes F.C. players
Hayes F.C. managers
1959 deaths
Isthmian League players
People from Brentford
Footballers from Brentford
English football managers